Heather Nicole Wells, (born October 29, 1989) is an American beauty pageant titleholder from Warren, Ohio who was named Miss Ohio 2013.

Biography
She won the title of Miss Ohio on June 22, 2013, when she received her crown from outgoing titleholder Elissa McCracken. Wells’ platform is “Divorce Recovery for Youth” and she said she hoped to use her own experience as the child of divorced parents to set up recovery programs for youths dealing with their parent's divorce during her year as Miss Ohio. Her competition talent was a lyrical dance to CeCe Winans' “Alabaster Box.” Wells is a graduate of Kent State University, with a degree in broadcast journalism.

References

External links

 
 

Miss America 2014 delegates
1989 births
Living people
People from Warren, Ohio
Kent State University alumni
American beauty pageant winners